IITT may refer to:

 IITT is an acronym for Indian Institute of Technology Tirupati, an institute centrally funded by MHRD, INDIA
 Institute of IT Training, a professional body for training professionals (UK and Europe)
IITT college of Engineering, Kala Amb, an institution of higher education in the state of Himachal Pradesh, INDIA